Billy Wilder (1906–2002) was an Austrian-born American filmmaker. Wilder initially pursued a career in journalism after being inspired by an American newsreel. He worked for the Austrian magazine Die Bühne and the newspaper Die Stunde in Vienna, and later for the German newspapers Berliner Nachtausgabe, and Berliner Börsen-Courier in Berlin. His first screenplay was for the German silent thriller The Daredevil Reporter (1929). Wilder fled to Paris in 1933 after the rise of the Nazi Party, where he co-directed and co-wrote the screenplay of French drama Mauvaise Graine (1934). In the same year, Wilder left France on board the RMS Aquitania to work in Hollywood despite having little knowledge of English.

In 1938, he began collaborating with Charles Brackett on screenplays with Ernst Lubitsch's romantic comedy Bluebeard's Eighth Wife. It was the first of 14 consecutive commercially successful films that the pair co-wrote including the comedy Ninotchka (1939), and the romantic drama Hold Back the Dawn (1941), which both received nominations for the Academy Award for Best Screenplay. Wilder made his Hollywood directorial debut with comedy The Major and the Minor (1942), which starred Ginger Rogers and Ray Milland. Two years later, he directed and co-wrote the screenplay for the film noir Double Indemnity (1944), which is considered a classic of its genre. He followed this with The Lost Weekend (1945), a drama about a writer struggling with alcoholism, for which Wilder won his first Academy Award for Best Director and shared the Best Original Screenplay award with Brackett. The film also won Best Picture.

Wilder directed and co-wrote the screenplay for Sunset Boulevard (1950), a film noir about a reclusive silent film actress starring Gloria Swanson and William Holden. It garnered 11 Academy Award nominations including Best Picture, Best Director, and all four acting categories. He won his second Best Screenplay Oscar with Brackett for the film as well as the Writers Guild of America Award for Best Written Drama. During the 1950s, Wilder also received Best Director nominations at the Oscars for Stalag 17 (1953), Sabrina (1954), Witness for the Prosecution (1957), and Some Like It Hot (1959). The lattermost film starring Marilyn Monroe, Tony Curtis, and Jack Lemmon is considered one of the best comedies of all time. In 1960, he directed and co-wrote The Apartment, a romantic comedy about an insurance clerk who allows his coworkers to use his apartment to conduct extra-marital affairs, which starred Lemmon and Shirley MacLaine. The film won the Academy Award for Best Picture and the BAFTA Award for Best Film. Wilder shared the Academy Award for Best Original Screenplay with I. A. L. Diamond.

In recognition of his career, Wilder received the AFI's Life Achievement Award, the British Academy of Film and Television Arts (BAFTA) Fellowship Award, the Directors Guild of America's Lifetime Achievement Award, the Irving G. Thalberg Memorial Award, the Laurel Award for Screenwriting Achievement, and the Producers Guild of America's Lifetime Achievement Award. Double Indemnity, Sunset Boulevard, Some Like It Hot, and The Apartment are included in the AFI's greatest American films of all time. As of 2019, 10 of his films are in the National Film Registry.

Films

As filmmaker

As writer

Bibliography

References

External links
 

 
Wilder, Billy